Chalam Bennurkar (died 2017) was an Indian documentary film maker, film activist and director who is best known for his Tamil documentary film Children of Mini-Japan (Kutty Japanin Kuzhandaigal) which won the Citizens' Prize and Encouragement Prize in Yamagata International Documentary Film Festival and Golden Dove in International Leipzig Festival for Documentary and Animated Film (Germany), in the year 1991.

Career
Chalam was a college drop out who worked as a signboard painter and became part of CIEDS Collective and Vimochana in Bangalore. He had initiated Janamadhyam, a screening network and production infrastructure for grassroots action while he was associated with CIEDS Collective and Vimochana. To encourage the independent documentary film makers in India he created Sakshi a platform for young filmmakers to showcase their work through Bangalore Film Society and Odessa in Kerala.

Filmography
 Children of Mini-Japan 
 All About My Famila
 Bishaar Blues
 On Latur
 Naavu Yeravaru

Accolades
Chalam was awarded numerous accolades for his work. The most important ones are:

 Yamagata International Documentary Film Festival - 1991
 International Documentary and Short Film Festival of Kerala
 International Leipzig Festival for Documentary and Animated Film Award

References

External links

Indian documentary filmmakers
Film directors from Karnataka
1950s births
2017 deaths
Year of birth uncertain